Otto Franz von Möllendorff (24 December 1848 – 17 August 1903) was a German scientist, a malacologist. In 1894, Jose Rizal sent (from Dapitan) to Möllendorff (who was in Manila at that time) specimens of large sea snails known as tun shells together with some specimens of a species of small freshwater snails stored in glass vials. The species of small snails was later named Oncomelania quadrasi by Möllendorff in 1895 in honour of Don José Florencio Quadras, a Spanish malacologist who was also based in Manila at that time.

A species of rat snake, Elaphe moellendorffi, is named in his honor.

Bibliography
Reisen im Archipel der Philippinen.
WoRMS: list of marine species named by Otto Franz von Möllendorff.

References

External links
.
 Obituary: W. Kobelt, 1903. Otto Franz von Moellendorff. Journal of Malacology 10(4): 122-125, pl. 11 [translated by D. F. Heynemann, from Kobelt (1903), Nachrichtsblatt der Deutschen Malakozoologischen Gesellschaft 35(11- 12): 161-167].

German malacologists
1848 births
1903 deaths